Coleophora tremefacta is a moth of the family Coleophoridae. It is found in Australia in the coastal regions of South Australia, north of Adelaide.

References

External links
Australian Faunal Directory

Moths of Australia
tremefacta
Moths described in 1921
Taxa named by Edward Meyrick